The Jazz June is an American emo band from Kutztown, Pennsylvania. 

In 2016, Rolling Stone placed the band's album The Medicine at number 33 on its list of the 40 Greatest Emo Albums of All Time.

History
The Jazz June was formed in 1996 by students attending Kutztown University. The group recorded its first full-length album in 1997; their first two albums were recorded through Canadian record label Workshop Records. In 1998, the band signed with Initial Records and went on to release three albums through the record label. They disbanded in 2003 after four full-length albums, but reunited for benefit shows in 2006 and the release of an outtakes-and-rarities compilation the following year. In 2014, the group announced they were reforming and releasing new material on Topshelf Records.

Name
The band's name is derived from a passage in the Gwendolyn Brooks poem "We Real Cool."

Members
Andrew Low – vocals, guitar
Bryan Gassler – guitar
Daniel O'Neill – bass
Justin Max – drums
Adam Gerhart
Nathaniel Duncan
Tim Holland -- guitar, trumpet, keyboards

Discography
They Love Those Who Make The Music (Workshop Records, 1997)
The Boom, the Motion, and the Music EP (Workshop Records, 1998)
Breakdance Suburbia (Initial Records, 1998)
The Medicine (Initial Records, 2000)
Better Off Without Air (Initial Records, 2002)
The Scars to Prove It compilation (Universal Warning, 2007)
After the Earthquake (Topshelf Records, 2014)

References

American emo musical groups
Rock music groups from Pennsylvania
Musical groups established in 1996
Musical groups disestablished in 2003
Musical groups reestablished in 2014
Topshelf Records artists